Ephraim McLean Brank (August 1, 1791 - August 5, 1875) was a Kentucky soldier in the War of 1812, noted for his exceptional marksmanship which played a decisive role in the American victory at the Battle of New Orleans.

Early life and family
Ephraim Brank was born in North Carolina. He was the son of Robert and Margaret (McLean) Brank. His mother was the sister of future Kentucky Congressman Alney McLean.

Brank received his early education in his home state and moved to Muhlenberg County, Kentucky in 1808. He settled in a house on Main Street in Greenville about a half mile north of the county court house. He practiced law and also worked as a surveyor.

Brank married Mary Campbell. The couple had five children: Louise (Brank) Taylor, Tabitha (Brank) Yost, Samuel C. Brank (who died in childhood), Rev. Robert G. Brank, and Mary Jane (Brank) Yost. Mary Campbell Brank died December 4, 1850. Brank later married Ruth B. Weir.

War of 1812
At the outbreak of the War of 1812, three companies from Muhlenberg County were raised. Brank was commissioned a lieutenant in a company raised by his uncle, Alney McLean, that enlisted on November 20, 1814. Brank's unit participated in the January 8, 1815 Battle of New Orleans, serving under General Andrew Jackson and was active until May 20, 1815.

In the book Kentucky in the Nation's History, author Robert McNutt McElroy relates the following anonymous anecdote recorded by a British officer who was present at the battle describing an American marksman of great skill and the damage he inflicted on the British forces:

In a footnote, McElroy identifies Brank as the subject of the passage. In a 1910 article published in The Record, a Greenville newspaper, historian Otto Rothert records that Brank's own account of the battle substantially agreed with that of the British officer. One notable difference held that Brank did not reload his rifle himself, but fired rifles that were reloaded and handed up to him by two of his fellow soldiers.  In 2003, rifle expert Gary Yee analyzed the details of the account and determined that Brank could not have single-handedly repelled the British column, but it was likely that his solid marksmanship and imposing presence intimidated the British officers, breaking their resolve and prompting their retreat.

Later life and legacy
Brank spent his later years engaged in agricultural pursuits on his farm, but remained interested in the growth and development of his hometown. In 1834, he was chosen as one of three commissioners to oversee the construction of a new county courthouse.

Brank died in Greenville on August 5, 1875 and was buried under a military headstone at an honored place in the town cemetery. Brank Street in Greenville was named in his honor, and "The Ballad of Ephraim Brank" was composed to celebrate his life.

References

Bibliography

1791 births
1875 deaths
American militiamen in the War of 1812
American surveyors
Kentucky lawyers
People from Greenville, Kentucky
People from North Carolina
19th-century American lawyers